May refer to the following critical editions of the Vulgate text:

 Oxford Vulgate, a critical edition of the Vulgate New Testament
Benedictine Vulgate, a critical edition of the Vulgate Old Testament, Catholic deuterocanonicals included
 Stuttgart Vulgate, a critical edition of the Vulgate Old and New Testaments